1P-AL-LAD is a derivative of lysergic acid diethylamide (LSD) which has psychedelic effects and has been sold as a designer drug. It is believed to act as a prodrug for AL-LAD and produces a head-twitch response in animal studies.

See also 
 1cP-AL-LAD
 1P-ETH-LAD

References 

Lysergamides
Carboxamides
Tertiary amines
Diethylamino compounds